Eduardo Albuquerque (23 July 1928 – 12 January 2011) was a Portuguese athlete. He competed in the men's hammer throw at the 1960 Summer Olympics.

References

External links
 

1928 births
2011 deaths
Athletes (track and field) at the 1960 Summer Olympics
Portuguese male hammer throwers
Olympic athletes of Portugal
Athletes from Lisbon